Mark McFadden is a broadcaster and journalist with ITV News.  He is based in Northern Ireland where he broadcasts for UTV.

He is currently the North West correspondent for UTV Live, the flagship early evening news programme on the channel.

Early life
McFadden was born in Derry in 1965. He is a former pupil of St. Columb's College - a school that boasts Nobel prize-winners Seamus Heaney and John Hume among its alumni. After St. Columb's he studied English and French at Queen's University, Belfast.

Journalism career
His career in journalism began in 1988 with the Derry Journal, the second oldest English-language newspaper in the world.

During six years at the Journal he worked in news, features and sports. He also contributed news and sports reports to London broadsheet newspapers The Guardian and The Daily Telegraph.

Broadcasting career
In April 1994, McFadden joined the UTV Live team becoming the face of UTV in the North West of Ulster. He works mainly on hard news reports - covering politics, serious crime, terrorism, the economy, etc. However, he also produces a wide range of material for the sports and features departments.

McFadden was UTV's correspondent throughout the entire course of the Bloody Sunday Inquiry. This Tribunal of Inquiry was chaired by Lord Saville of Newdigate, and it sat at the Guildhall in Derry and Methodist Central Hall in London. It was the longest and most expensive Inquiry in UK legal history. McFadden was the only television journalist to cover the Bloody Sunday Inquiry from its inception in 1998 to its conclusion in June 2010 when Lord Saville's final report was published.

In April 2011 he was one of UTV's analysts for Queen Elizabeth II's historic state visit to the Republic of Ireland, broadcasting from Dublin Castle and Croke Park. McFadden has also presented several series of "Rare Breed" for UTV, examining the multi-billion pound agriculture industry in Ireland.

He is primarily based in UTV's new studio in Derry.

World Awards

McFadden has won a number of prestigious journalism awards at regional, national and international levels. In April 2011, he picked up two top prizes at the New York Festival's World Film & Television Awards. He won the World Gold Medal for journalism in recognition of his coverage of Lord Saville's inquiry into the Bloody Sunday shootings, and he scooped the World Silver Medal for his 2010 UTV documentary 'Insight: Bloody Justice' which examined Bloody Sunday and the Saville Inquiry.

'Bloody Justice' was also winner of the News & Current Affairs Programme of the Year prize at the 2011 Institute of Public Relations media awards. The Chairman of the Judges at the IPR Awards said: "I thought I knew all about Bloody Sunday until I watched 'Bloody Justice'. The sequence re-enacting the individual killings was gripping, evocative and startling. Each part of the current affairs machine purred powerfully through this splendid offering."

McFadden has since become a jury member for the World Film and TV Awards.

References

Journalists from Northern Ireland
UTV (TV channel)
Living people
People educated at St Columb's College
Year of birth missing (living people)